Costello is an American television sitcom created by Sue Costello and Cheryl Holliday, that aired on Fox from September 15 to October 13, 1998.

Premise
The series was about an Irish-American family in South Boston.  The central character is Sue Murphy (Sue Costello), a barmaid who has broken up with her boyfriend and is trying to improve herself, despite the incomprehension of her blue-collar family.

Cast
Sue Costello as Sue Murphy
Jenny O'Hara as Lottie Murphy
Dan Lauria as Spud Murphy
Kerry O'Malley as Trish Donnelly
Chuck Walczak as Jimmy Murphy
Timothy Pickering as Fingers

Critical response
The show wasn't popular with critics, who considered it vulgar and shouty. A review in The New York Times said, "There are entirely too many colorfully crude blue-collar characters". The Los Angeles Times called it a more working-class Cheers and criticised Costello's acting ability.

Episodes

References

External links

1990s American sitcoms
1998 American television series debuts
1998 American television series endings
English-language television shows
Fox Broadcasting Company original programming
Irish-American mass media
Television shows set in Boston
Television series by ABC Studios